The mourning collared dove or African mourning dove (Streptopelia decipiens) is a dove which is a widespread resident breeding bird in Africa south of the Sahara. Despite its name, it is not related to the North American mourning dove (Zenaida macroura). This species is common or abundant near water.  They often mingle peacefully with other doves.

Description
The mourning collared dove is a largish, stocky pigeon, up to 31 cm in length. Its back, wings and tail are pale brown. The head is grey and the underparts are pink, shading to pale grey on the belly. There is a black hind neck patch edged with white. The legs and a patch of bare skin around the eye are red.

When flying, it shows blackish flight feathers and extensive white in the tail, the latter being a distinction from the similar but larger red-eyed dove. The call is a fast krrrrrrrr, oo-OO, oo.

Sexes are similar, but immatures are duller than adults, and have scalloping on the body feathers.

Behaviour

The mourning collared dove's flight is quick, with the regular beats and an occasional sharp flick of the wings which are characteristic of pigeons in general.

Diet and feeding
Mourning collared doves eat grass seeds, grains and other vegetation. They are quite terrestrial, and usually forage on the ground. Unlike several other species in this genus, they are quite gregarious and often feed in groups.

Reproduction
It builds a stick nest in a tree, often a mangrove, and lays two white eggs.

References 

 Birds of The Gambia by Barlow, Wacher and Disley,

External links
 Mourning collared dove - Species text in The Atlas of Southern African Birds.

mourning collared dove
Birds of Sub-Saharan Africa
mourning collared dove
mourning collared dove